Robert James Moroso (September 26, 1968  September 30, 1990) was a NASCAR racing driver who was champion of the NASCAR Busch Series (now Xfinity Series) in 1989, and was posthumously awarded the 1990 NASCAR Winston Cup (now NASCAR Cup Series) Rookie of the Year award. A promising young driver, he and another driver were killed when Moroso was driving under the influence at excessive speeds on roads near his hometown of Terrell, North Carolina.

Born in Greenwich, Connecticut, he was the son of Dick Moroso, founder of Moroso Performance, suppliers of aftermarket automotive parts, and former owner of Moroso Motorsports Park in Jupiter, Florida.

Early life
Moroso grew up in Madison, Connecticut, with two other siblings, Rick and Susan. His father was Richard D. "Dick" Moroso, who served as owner and sponsor for much of the younger Moroso's racing career.

After graduating from high school, Moroso enrolled in courses at Central Piedmont Community College in Charlotte, North Carolina, though he failed to complete them. He also attended the Buck Baker Racing School at Rockingham Speedway.

Racing career

Busch Series
Moroso made his debut in the Busch Series at Orange County Speedway in North Carolina in 1986, two days after his 18th birthday. Driving the No. 23 Old Milwaukee Chevrolet, he qualified an impressive sixth, but finished 21st after suspension issues. He made his second start of the season in Rick Hendrick's No. 15 Chevrolet at Rockingham Speedway, finishing 18th. Moroso began running full-time in 1987, driving the No. 25 Oldsmobile owned by his father and sponsored by Moroso Performance. Moroso ran 25 of 27 races that season, with eight top tens and a 15th-place points finish. 1988 was a breakout season for Moroso. He won his first career race in July 1988 at Myrtle Beach Speedway, at the age of 19, after out-dueling defending series champion Larry Pearson. He would score his second win of the season at Charlotte, and finished second in the final Busch series points to Tommy Ellis.

In 1989, Moroso was vying with veteran driver Tommy Houston for the championship in the final race of the year, at Martinsville Speedway. Houston's engine failed during the race, while Moroso finished third and won the title by 55 points over Houston. At the time Moroso was the youngest champion in the history of NASCAR. Moroso won a total of six races from 1988 to 1989, including 3 consecutive at Charlotte Motor Speedway, and was voted the most popular driver on the circuit.

Winston Cup Series

Moroso made his debut in Winston Cup in 1988 at Charlotte in the No. 47 Peak Antifreeze Chevrolet for Hendrick Motorsports, finishing 14th. He would race one more time in 1988 and ran two races in 1989 as a warm up for the following season. Moroso declared he was running for Rookie of the Year in the 1990 season, driving the No. 20 Crown Central Petroleum Oldsmobile for his father. The highlight of the season was a ninth-place finish in the Pepsi Firecracker 400 at Daytona. Other than that, Moroso posted no wins, no top 5's, and only 1 top 10 and DNF'd in 15 races.

Death
On September 30, 1990, four days after his 22nd birthday, Moroso was killed in an automobile crash on North Carolina Highway 150 near Mooresville, North Carolina, only hours after finishing 21st in the Holly Farms 400 at North Wilkesboro Speedway. Traveling at an estimated , Moroso lost control of his vehicle in a curve with a  posted speed limit, skidding over 200 feet before being struck in the driver's side door by an oncoming car in the opposite lane. The resulting collision killed both Moroso and Tammy Williams, a 27-year-old nursing assistant, wife and mother who was driving in the opposite lane. The passenger in Moroso's vehicle, girlfriend Debbie Bryant, as well as a passenger in Williams' vehicle both survived with injuries.

Investigations revealed that he had been driving under the influence of alcohol. Moroso had been seen drinking several beers at a Cornelius, North Carolina, lounge prior to the crash, and his blood alcohol level was found to be 0.22, over twice the then legal level of 0.10. He also had been convicted of speeding four times between 1987 and 1989, and had been involved in two prior highway crashes which included a rollover. Judges could have revoked his license at least twice but the charges were reduced.

Moroso earned enough points after completing just 25 of 29 races that he was awarded the Raybestos NASCAR Rookie of the Year Award in 1990, the only driver to ever receive the award posthumously.

Motorsports career results

NASCAR
(key) (Bold – Pole position awarded by qualifying time. Italics – Pole position earned by points standings or practice time. * – Most laps led.)

Winston Cup Series

Daytona 500

Busch Series

Busch North Series

References

External links
 

1968 births
1990 deaths
People from Madison, Connecticut
Racing drivers from Connecticut
NASCAR drivers
NASCAR Xfinity Series champions
ISCARS Dash Touring Series drivers
Road incident deaths in North Carolina
Sportspeople from Greenwich, Connecticut
Hendrick Motorsports drivers